The 2010 Cerveza Club Premium Open was a professional tennis tournament played on outdoor red clay courts. It was the sixteenth edition of the tournament which was part of the 2010 ATP Challenger Tour. It took place in Quito, Ecuador between 4 and 11 October 2010.

ATP entrants

Seeds

 Rankings are as of September 27, 2010.

Other entrants
The following players received wildcards into the singles main draw:
  Júlio César Campozano
  Giovanni Lapentti
  Roberto Quiroz
  Walter Valarezo

The following players received entry from the qualifying draw:
  Diego Álvarez
  Tiago Lopes
  Maciek Sykut
  Daniel Yoo
  Christopher Racz (Lucky loser replacing Bruno Rodríguez)

Champions

Singles

 Giovanni Lapentti def.  João Souza, 2–6, 6–3, 6–4

Doubles

 Daniel Garza /  Eric Nunez def.  Alejandro González /  Carlos Salamanca, 7–5, 6–4

References
Official website
ATP World Tour official website
ITF Search 

 
Cerveza Club Premium Open
Cerveza Club Premium Open
Clay court tennis tournaments
Tennis tournaments in Ecuador
Cerveza Club Premium Open